The AMD Jaguar Family 16h is a low-power microarchitecture designed by AMD. It is used in APUs succeeding the Bobcat Family microarchitecture in 2013 and being succeeded by AMD's Puma architecture in 2014. It is two-way superscalar and capable of out-of-order execution. It is used in AMD's Semi-Custom Business Unit as a design for custom processors and is used by AMD in four product families: Kabini aimed at notebooks and mini PCs, Temash aimed at tablets, Kyoto aimed at micro-servers, and the G-Series aimed at embedded applications. Both the PlayStation 4 and the Xbox One use chips based on the Jaguar microarchitecture, with more powerful GPUs than AMD sells in its own commercially available Jaguar APUs.

Design 

 32 KiB instruction + 32 KiB data L1 cache per core, L1 cache includes parity error detection
 16-way, 1–2 MiB unified L2 cache shared by two or four cores, L2 cache is protected from errors by the use of error correcting code
 Out-of-order execution and speculative execution
 Integrated memory controller
 Two-way integer execution
 Two-way 128-bit wide floating-point and packed integer execution
 Integer hardware divider
 Consumer processors support two DDR3L DIMMs in one channel at frequencies up to 1600 MHz
 Server processors support two DDR3 DIMMs in one channel at frequencies up to 1600 MHz with ECC
 As a SoC (not just an APU) it integrates Fusion controller hub
 Jaguar does not feature clustered multi-thread (CMT), meaning that execution resources are not shared between cores

Instruction set support 
The Jaguar core has support for the following instruction sets and instructions: MMX, SSE, SSE2, SSE3, SSSE3, SSE4a, SSE4.1, SSE4.2, AVX, F16C, CLMUL, AES, BMI1, MOVBE (Move Big-Endian instruction), XSAVE/XSAVEOPT, ABM (POPCNT/LZCNT), and AMD-V.

Improvements over Bobcat 

 Over 10% increase in clock frequency
 Over 15% improvement in instructions per clock (IPC)
 Added support for SSE4.1, SSE4.2, AES, CLMUL, MOVBE, AVX, F16C, BMI1
 Up to four CPU cores
 L2 cache is shared between cores
 FPU datapath width increased to 128-bit
 Added hardware integer divider
 Enhanced cache prefetchers
 Doubled bandwidth of load-store units
 C6 and CC6 low power states with lower entry and exit latency
 Smaller, 3.1 mm2 area per core
 Integrated Fusion controller hub (FCH)
 Video Coding Engine

Features

Processors

Consoles

Desktop 
SoCs using Socket AM1:

Desktop/Mobile (28 nm)

Server

Opteron X1100-series "Kyoto" (28 nm)

Opteron X2100-series "Kyoto" (28 nm)

Embedded

Jaguar derivative and successor 
In 2017 a derivative of the Jaguar microarchitecture was announced in the APU of Microsoft's Xbox One X (Project Scorpio) revision to the Xbox One. The Project Scorpio APU is described as a 'customized' derivative of the Jaguar microarchitecture, utilizing eight cores clocked at 2.3 GHz.

The Puma successor to Jaguar was released in 2014 and targeting entry level notebooks and tablets.

References 

AMD x86 microprocessors
AMD microarchitectures
X86 microarchitectures